Chazelles may refer to the following places in France:

Chazelles, Cantal, a commune in the department of Cantal
Chazelles, Charente, a commune in the department of Charente
Chazelles, Jura, a commune in the department of Jura
Chazelles, Haute-Loire, a commune in the department of Haute-Loire
Chazelles-sur-Albe, a commune in the department of Meurthe-et-Moselle
Chazelles-sur-Lavieu, a commune in the department of Loire
Chazelles-sur-Lyon, a commune in the department of Loire